Torano may refer to a number of places in Italy:
Torano Castello, Italian commune in the Province of Cosenza
Torano Nuovo, Italian commune in the Province of Teramo
Torano di Borgorose, frazione of the commune of Borgorose (Province of Rieti), known for the junction between the Autostrada A24 and the Autostrada A25
Torano (river), a river which forms part of the Volturno basin
Torano (Carrara), frazione of the commune of Carrara (Province of Massa-Carrara)